Romain Crevoisier (born 5 August 1965 in Moutier) is a retired Swiss football goalkeeper who played in the late 1980s, 1990s and early 2000s. He is now a goalkeeping coach at FC Basel.

Crevoisier began playing professionally in 1987 with FC La Chaux-de-Fonds. He left for SR Delémont in 1992, and played there for four years before he signed for SC Kriens in 1996. In 1997, he was elected best goalkeeper in the Swiss championship. In 2000, he signed for FC Basel but was reserve goalkeeper for most of his time there. He retired from playing in 2004 and became FC Basel's goalkeeping coach in August 2005. In January 2013 he signed at FC Sion as a goalkeeping coach.

External links
 Career Stats

1965 births
Living people
Sportspeople from Lausanne
Swiss men's footballers
Swiss Super League players
Association football goalkeepers
SR Delémont players
SC Kriens players
FC Luzern players
FC Basel players
Swiss-French people
FC Basel non-playing staff
Association football goalkeeping coaches